Donald "Don" T. Chadwick (born 1936) is an American industrial designer specializing in office seating.


Early life
He was born in Los Angeles and developed an interest in furniture making from his grandfather, a cabinetmaker. He studied design at the University of California, Los Angeles.

Career
He worked for architect Victor Gruen, and in 1964 founded his own practice. As a young designer Chadwick gained recognition for his entries in the Pasadena Art Museum's California Design exhibitions. His 1968 prototype for cardboard furniture predates the easy edges cardboard furniture by Frank Gehry. He has designed the Chadwick modular seating system (1974) and, in cooperation with Bill Stumpf, the Equa 1 (1984) and the Aeron chair (1994), all for Herman Miller.
Among his recent designs is the Chadwick chair and Spark chair for Knoll, and Ballo for Human Scale.

Publications 

 Friedman, Mildred, Ed. A Serious Chair — Design Quarterly 126. Minneapolis and Cambridge: The Walker Art Center and Massachusetts Institute of Technology, 1984. 
 Olivares, Jonathan, Ed. Don Chadwick Photography 1961-2005. Barcelona: Apartamento Publishing S.L., 2019 
 Amy Auscherman, Sam Gawe, Leon Ransmeier, Eds. "Ergon Chairs 1976" in Herman Miller: A Way of Living. London: Phaidon Press, 2019. 460-481

Awards
 I.D. magazine Award for Design Excellence, 1970, 1971, 1973, 1974
 ASID Award for Ergon seating, 1976
 The Governor's Award, Design Michigan Exhibition, 1977
 I.D. magazine "Designer of the 70s", 1979
 IBD and IDSA awards for casegoods, 1980
 IBD Gold Award for Equa chair, 1984
 IBD Gold Award for Ethospace interiors, 1985
 Time magazine, design: "Best of the Decade" for Equa chair, 1990
 BusinessWeek magazine and Industrial Designers Society of America awarded Design of the Decade to the Aeron chair, 2000
 National Design Awards, Product Design winner, 2006

References 

American furniture designers
California people in design
1936 births
Living people
Artists from Los Angeles